In mathematics, a Fermat number, named after Pierre de Fermat, who first studied them, is a positive integer of the form

where n is a non-negative integer. The first few Fermat numbers are:
 3, 5, 17, 257, 65537, 4294967297, 18446744073709551617, ... .

Basic properties
The Fermat numbers satisfy the following recurrence relations:

for n ≥ 1,

Each of these relations can be proved by mathematical induction. From the second equation, we can deduce Goldbach's theorem (named after Christian Goldbach): no two Fermat numbers share a common integer factor greater than 1. To see this, suppose that  and Fi and Fj have a common factor . Then a divides both

and Fj; hence a divides their difference, 2. Since , this forces . This is a contradiction, because each Fermat number is clearly odd. As a corollary, we obtain another proof of the infinitude of the prime numbers: for each Fn, choose a prime factor pn; then the sequence  is an infinite sequence of distinct primes.

Further properties
 No Fermat prime can be expressed as the difference of two pth powers, where p is an odd prime.
 With the exception of F0 and F1, the last digit of a Fermat number is 7.
 The sum of the reciprocals of all the Fermat numbers  is irrational. (Solomon W. Golomb, 1963)

Primality
Fermat numbers and Fermat primes were first studied by Pierre de Fermat, who conjectured that all Fermat numbers are prime. Indeed, the first five Fermat numbers F0, ..., F4 are easily shown to be prime. Fermat's conjecture was refuted by Leonhard Euler in 1732 when he showed that

That 641 is a factor of F5 can be deduced from the equalities 641 = 27 × 5 + 1 and 641 = 24 + 54. It follows from the first equality that 27 × 5 ≡ −1 (mod 641) and therefore (raising to the fourth power) that 228 × 54 ≡ 1 (mod 641). On the other hand, the second equality implies that 54 ≡ −24 (mod 641). These congruences imply that 232 ≡ −1 (mod 641).

Fermat was probably aware of the form of the factors later proved by Euler, so it seems curious that he failed to follow through on the straightforward calculation to find the factor. One common explanation is that Fermat made a computational mistake.

In fact, each of the following is an open problem:
 Is Fn composite for all ?
 Are there infinitely many Fermat primes? (Eisenstein 1844)
 Are there infinitely many composite Fermat numbers?
 Does a Fermat number exist that is not square-free?

The largest Fermat number known to be composite is F18233954, and its prime factor  was discovered in October 2020.

Heuristic arguments
Heuristics suggest that F4 is the last Fermat prime.

The prime number theorem implies that a random integer in a suitable interval around N is prime with probability 1/ln N. If one uses the heuristic that a Fermat number is prime with the same probability as a random integer of its size, and that F5, ..., F32 are composite, then the expected number of Fermat primes beyond F4 (or equivalently, beyond F32) should be 

One may interpret this number as an upper bound for the probability that a Fermat prime beyond F4 exists.

This argument is not a rigorous proof. For one thing, it assumes that Fermat numbers behave "randomly", but the factors of Fermat numbers have special properties. Boklan and Conway published a more precise analysis suggesting that the probability that there is another Fermat prime is less than one in a billion.

Equivalent conditions

Let  be the nth Fermat number.

 is prime if and only if 

The expression  can be evaluated modulo  by repeated squaring. This makes the test a fast polynomial-time algorithm. But Fermat numbers grow so rapidly that only a handful of them can be tested in a reasonable amount of time and space.

There are some tests for numbers of the form , such as factors of Fermat numbers, for primality.

Proth's theorem (1878). Let  with odd . If there is an integer a such that
 
then  is prime. Conversely, if the above congruence does not hold, and in addition
  (See Jacobi symbol)
then  is composite.

Although Pépin's test and Proth's theorem have been implemented on computers to prove the compositeness of some Fermat numbers, neither test gives a specific nontrivial factor.

Factorization
Because of Fermat numbers' size, it is difficult to factorize or even to check primality. Pépin's test gives a necessary and sufficient condition for primality of Fermat numbers, and can be implemented by modern computers. The elliptic curve method is a fast method for finding small prime divisors of numbers. Distributed computing project Fermatsearch has found some factors of Fermat numbers. Yves Gallot's proth.exe has been used to find factors of large Fermat numbers. Édouard Lucas, improving Euler's above-mentioned result, proved in 1878 that every factor of the Fermat number , with n at least 2, is of the form  (see Proth number), where k is a positive integer. By itself, this makes it easy to prove the primality of the known Fermat primes.

Factorizations of the first twelve Fermat numbers are:

{|
|- valign="top"
|F0 ||=|| 21||+||1 ||=||3 is prime||
|- valign="top"
|F1 ||=|| 22||+||1 ||=||5 is prime||
|- valign="top"
|F2 ||=|| 24||+||1 ||=||17 is prime||
|- valign="top"
|F3 ||=|| 28||+||1 ||=||257 is prime||
|- valign="top"
|F4 ||=|| 216||+||1 ||=||65,537 is the largest known Fermat prime||
|- valign="top"
|F5 ||=|| 232||+||1 ||=||4,294,967,297||
|- style="background:white; color:#700000"
| || || || || ||=||641 × 6,700,417 (fully factored 1732)
|- valign="top"
|F6 ||=|| 264||+||1 ||=||18,446,744,073,709,551,617 (20 digits) ||
|- style="background:white; color:#700000"
| || || || || ||=||274,177 × 67,280,421,310,721 (14 digits) (fully factored 1855)
|- valign="top"
|F7 ||=|| 2128||+||1 ||=||340,282,366,920,938,463,463,374,607,431,768,211,457 (39 digits)||
|- style="background:white; color:#700000"
| || || || || ||=||59,649,589,127,497,217 (17 digits) × 5,704,689,200,685,129,054,721 (22 digits) (fully factored 1970)
|- valign="top"
|F8 ||=|| 2256||+||1 ||=||115,792,089,237,316,195,423,570,985,008,687,907,853,269,984,665,640,564,039,457,584,007,913,129,639,937 (78 digits)||
|- style="background:white; color:#700000; vertical-align:top"
| || || || || ||=||1,238,926,361,552,897 (16 digits) × 93,461,639,715,357,977,769,163,558,199,606,896,584,051,237,541,638,188,580,280,321 (62 digits) (fully factored 1980)
|- valign="top"
|F9 ||=|| 2512||+||1 ||=||13,407,807,929,942,597,099,574,024,998,205,846,127,479,365,820,592,393,377,723,561,443,721,764,030,073,546,976,801,874,298,166,903,427,690,031,858,186,486,050,853,753,882,811,946,569,946,433,649,006,084,097 (155 digits)||
|- style="background:white; color:#700000; vertical-align:top"
| || || || || ||=|| 2,424,833 × 7,455,602,825,647,884,208,337,395,736,200,454,918,783,366,342,657 (49 digits) × 741,640,062,627,530,801,524,787,141,901,937,474,059,940,781,097,519,023,905,821,316,144,415,759,504,705,008,092,818,711,693,940,737 (99 digits) (fully factored 1990)
|- valign="top"
|F10 ||=|| 21024||+||1
||=||179,769,313,486,231,590,772,930...304,835,356,329,624,224,137,217 (309 digits)||
|- style="background:white; color:#700000; vertical-align:top"
| || || || || ||=||45,592,577 × 6,487,031,809 × 4,659,775,785,220,018,543,264,560,743,076,778,192,897 (40 digits) × 130,439,874,405,488,189,727,484...806,217,820,753,127,014,424,577 (252 digits) (fully factored 1995)
|- valign="top"
|F11 ||=|| 22048||+||1
||=||32,317,006,071,311,007,300,714,8...193,555,853,611,059,596,230,657 (617 digits)||
|- style="background:white; color:#700000; vertical-align:top"
| || || || || ||=|| 319,489 × 974,849 × 167,988,556,341,760,475,137 (21 digits) × 3,560,841,906,445,833,920,513 (22 digits) × 173,462,447,179,147,555,430,258...491,382,441,723,306,598,834,177 (564 digits) (fully factored 1988)
|-
|}

, only F0 to F11 have been completely factored. The distributed computing project Fermat Search is searching for new factors of Fermat numbers. The set of all Fermat factors is A050922 (or, sorted, A023394) in OEIS.

The following factors of Fermat numbers were known before 1950 (since then, digital computers have helped find more factors):

, 356 prime factors of Fermat numbers are known, and 312 Fermat numbers are known to be composite. Several new Fermat factors are found each year.

Pseudoprimes and Fermat numbers
Like composite numbers of the form 2p − 1, every composite Fermat number is a strong pseudoprime to base 2. This is because all strong pseudoprimes to base 2 are also Fermat pseudoprimes – i.e.,

for all Fermat numbers.

In 1904, Cipolla showed that the product of at least two distinct prime or composite Fermat numbers   will be a Fermat pseudoprime to base 2 if and only if .

Other theorems about Fermat numbers

A Fermat number cannot be a perfect number or part of a pair of amicable numbers. 

The series of reciprocals of all prime divisors of Fermat numbers is convergent. 

If  is prime, there exists an integer m such that . The equation

holds in that case.

Let the largest prime factor of the Fermat number Fn be P(Fn). Then,

Relationship to constructible polygons

Carl Friedrich Gauss developed the theory of Gaussian periods in his Disquisitiones Arithmeticae and formulated a sufficient condition for the constructibility of regular polygons. Gauss stated that this condition was also necessary, but never published a proof. Pierre Wantzel gave a full proof of necessity in 1837. The result is known as the Gauss–Wantzel theorem:

 An n-sided regular polygon can be constructed with compass and straightedge if and only if n is the product of a power of 2 and distinct Fermat primes: in other words, if and only if n is of the form , where k, s are nonnegative integers and the pi are distinct Fermat primes.

A positive integer n is of the above form if and only if its totient φ(n) is a power of 2.

Applications of Fermat numbers

Pseudorandom number generation
Fermat primes are particularly useful in generating pseudo-random sequences of numbers in the range 1, ..., N, where N is a power of 2. Now multiply this by a number A, which is greater than the square root of P and is a primitive root modulo P (i.e., it is not a quadratic residue). Then take the result modulo P. The result is the new value for the RNG.
  (see linear congruential generator, RANDU)
This is useful in computer science, since most data structures have members with 2X possible values. For example, a byte has 256 (28) possible values (0–255). Therefore, to fill a byte or bytes with random values, a random number generator that produces values 1–256 can be used, the byte taking the output value −1. Very large Fermat primes are of particular interest in data encryption for this reason. This method produces only pseudorandom values, as after  repetitions, the sequence repeats.

Generalized Fermat numbers
Numbers of the form  with a, b any coprime integers, are called generalized Fermat numbers. An odd prime p is a generalized Fermat number if and only if p is congruent to 1 (mod 4). (Here we consider only the case , so  is not a counterexample.)

An example of a probable prime of this form is 1215131072 + 242131072 (found by Kellen Shenton).

By analogy with the ordinary Fermat numbers, it is common to write generalized Fermat numbers of the form  as Fn(a). In this notation, for instance, the number 100,000,001 would be written as F3(10). In the following we shall restrict ourselves to primes of this form, such primes are called "Fermat primes base a". Of course, these primes exist only if a is even.

If we require , then Landau's fourth problem asks if there are infinitely many generalized Fermat primes Fn(a).

Generalized Fermat primes
Because of the ease of proving their primality, generalized Fermat primes have become in recent years a topic for research within the field of number theory. Many of the largest known primes today are generalized Fermat primes.

Generalized Fermat numbers can be prime only for even , because if  is odd then every generalized Fermat number will be divisible by 2.

If  is a perfect power with an odd exponent , then all generalized Fermat number can be algebraic factored, so they cannot be prime)

(For the smallest number  such that  is prime, see )

(See  for more information (even bases up to 1000), also see  for odd bases)

(For the smallest prime of the form  (for odd ), see also )

(For the smallest even base  such that  is prime, see )

The smallest base b such that b2n + 1 is prime are
2, 2, 2, 2, 2, 30, 102, 120, 278, 46, 824, 150, 1534, 30406, 67234, 70906, 48594, 62722, 24518, 75898, 919444, ... 

The smallest k such that (2n)k + 1 is prime are
1, 1, 1, 0, 1, 1, 2, 1, 1, 2, 1, 2, 2, 1, 1, 0, 4, 1, ... (The next term is unknown)  (also see  and )

A more elaborate theory can be used to predict the number of bases for which  will be prime for fixed .

Largest known generalized Fermat primes
The following is a list of the 5 largest known generalized Fermat primes. The whole top-5 is discovered by participants in the PrimeGrid project.

On the Prime Pages one can find the current top 100 generalized Fermat primes.

See also
 Constructible polygon: which regular polygons are constructible partially depends on Fermat primes.
 Double exponential function
 Lucas' theorem
 Mersenne prime
 Pierpont prime
 Primality test
 Proth's theorem
 Pseudoprime
 Sierpiński number
 Sylvester's sequence

Notes

References

 - This book contains an extensive list of references.

External links
 Chris Caldwell, The Prime Glossary: Fermat number at The Prime Pages.
 Luigi Morelli, History of Fermat Numbers
 John Cosgrave, Unification of Mersenne and Fermat Numbers
 Wilfrid Keller, Prime Factors of Fermat Numbers
 
 
 
 Yves Gallot, Generalized Fermat Prime Search
 Mark S. Manasse, Complete factorization of the ninth Fermat number (original announcement)
 Peyton Hayslette, Largest Known Generalized Fermat Prime Announcement

Constructible polygons
Articles containing proofs
Unsolved problems in number theory
Large integers
Classes of prime numbers
Integer sequences